Tedi Sarafian is an American screenwriter. He was a co-writer of Terminator 3: Rise of the Machines (2003). He is the son of Richard C. Sarafian, and the brother of Richard Sarafian Jr. and Deran Sarafian and the nephew of Robert Altman.  He is also co-owner of Barefoot Sound, manufacturer of high-end recording monitors.

Filmography

Films
 Tank Girl (1995 - Writer)
 The Road Killers (1994 - Writer/Co-Producer)
 Rush Hour (film) (1998 - uncredited Writer)
 Terminator 3: Rise of the Machines (2003 - Story)
 The Possession of Michael King (2013 - Co-Executive Producer/Writer/Story)
 Altergeist (2014 - Writer/Director) - also known as Sighting

Television
 Killer Wave (2007 - Writer/Co-Executive Producer)
 Tidal Wave: No Escape (1997 - Writer/Co-Executive Producer)

References

External links

Living people
American male screenwriters
Place of birth missing (living people)
Year of birth missing (living people)
American people of Armenian descent